Palermo, main city of Sicily, has a big heritage of churches which ranges from the Arab-Norman-Byzantine style to the Gothic and the Baroque styles. In particular, the list includes the most important churches of the historic centre divided by the four areas of Kalsa, Albergaria, Seralcadi and Loggia.

Historic centre

Kalsa (or Tribunali) 
Churches:
 Sant'Anna la Misericordia
 Chiesa dell'Assunta
 San Carlo dei Milanesi
 San Cataldo
 Santa Caterina
 San Francesco d'Assisi
 San Giovanni dei Napoletani
 La Magione
 La Martorana
 Santa Maria degli Agonizzanti
 Santa Maria della Gancia
 Santa Maria dell'Itria alla Kalsa
 Santa Maria dei Miracoli
 Santa Maria della Pietà
 Santa Maria di Porto Salvo
 Santa Maria dello Spasimo
 San Mattia ai Crociferi
 San Nicola da Tolentino
 Santissima Pietà
 Santa Teresa alla Kalsa

Oratories:
 Oratorio dei Bianchi
 Oratorio dell'Immacolatella
 Oratorio di San Lorenzo

Albergaria (or Palazzo Reale) 
Churches:
 Cappella Palatina
 Carmine Maggiore
 Casa Professa
 Santa Chiara all'Albergaria
 Sant'Elena e Costantino
 San Francesco Saverio
 San Giorgio in Kemonia
 San Giovanni degli Eremiti
 San Giovanni dell'Origlione
 San Giuseppe dei Teatini
 Maria Santissima della Soledad
 Sant'Orsola
 La Pinta
 Santi Quaranta Martiri Pisani al Casalotto
 Santissimo Salvatore

Oratories:
 Oratorio del Carminello
 Oratorio delle Dame
 Oratorio di San Giuseppe dei Falegnami
 Oratorio di San Mercurio

Monte di Pietà or Seralcadi 
Churches:
 Palermo Cathedral
 Cappella dell'Incoronata
 Chiesa dell'Angelo Custode
 Sant'Agata alla Guilla
 Sant'Agostino
 Santi Cosma e Damiano
 Santa Cristina la Vetere
 Santi Diecimila Martiri
 Sacra Famiglia al Papireto
 San Giovanni alla Guilla
 San Gregorio Papa
 Immacolata Concezione al Capo
 Madonna delle Grazie dei Macellai
 Madonna di Monte Oliveto or Badia Nuova
 Santa Maria di Gesù al Capo
 Santa Maria della Mercede
 Santa Maria Maddalena
 Santa Ninfa dei Crociferi
 San Ranieri
 San Rocco
 Santa Rosalia ai Quattro Coronati
 San Stanislao Koskta
 Chiesa dei Tre Re

Oratories:
 Oratorio dei Santi Pietro e Paolo
 Oratorio di Santo Stefano protomartire

Castellamare or Loggia 
Churches:
 Sant'Alessandro dei Carbonai
 Sant'Andrea degli Amalfitani
 Sant'Andrea
 Sant'Antonio Abate
 Santa Cita or San Mamiliano
 San Domenico
 Sant'Eulalia dei Catalani
 San Gioacchino
 San Giorgio dei Genovesi
 Sant'Ignazio all'Olivella
 Madonna del Lume
 Madonna del Soccorso
 Santa Maria della Catena
 Santa Maria di Valverde
 Santa Maria la Nova
 San Matteo al Cassaro
 San Sebastiano a Porta Carbone
 Santa Sofia dei Tavernieri

Oratories:
 Oratorio di Santa Caterina d'Alessandria
 Oratorio del Rosario di Santa Cita
 Oratorio del Rosario di San Domenico

Others 
 San Ciro a Maredolce
 Ecce Homo all'Uditore
 San Francesco di Paola
 San Giovanni dei Lebbrosi
 Santa Lucia al Monte
 Madonna dei Rimedi
 Santa Maria di Monserrato
 Santa Maria della Pace
 Santo Spirito
 Santo Stefano Protomartire alla Zisa
 Cappella della Santissima Trinità alla Zisa
 Santuario di Santa Rosalia
 Monreale Cathedral

Non-Catholic churches 
 Anglican Church
 Waldensian Church

 
Christianity in Palermo
Buildings and structures in Palermo